Aharon Hoter-Yishai was the Israeli Military Advocate General in 1948-1950 and testified at the Eichmann trial in 1961.

Military and legal career
In 1945 Hoter-Yishai was an officer of the Jewish Brigade in the Second World War.  He served in Italy, Yugoslavia and Austria.

Hoter-Yishai was at the forefront of absolving Meir Tobianski posthumously.  Tobianski had been put on trial in June 1948 and executed for being a traitor.  Hoter-Yishai presided over a retrial at which he was found not guilty. He was tasked with coordinating the activities of the Brigade by Yehudah Arazi of the Aliyah B Organization. He visited several of the Nazi camps and places where Jewish survivors were including Freimann Flak-Kaserne and the St. Ottilien Archabbey. In June 1945 he arrived at Theresienstadt.  He also visited the camps at Dachau, Bergen-Belsen, and Mauthausen.

Eichmann trial

In 1961 Hoter-Yishai was called as witness in the trial of Adolf Eichmann.  He testified regarding what he found at the concentration camps his brigade liberated:

Attorney General: Mr. Hoter-Yishai, in 1945, at the end of the Second World War, you were in Europe as an officer in the second battalion of the Jewish Brigade – is that correct?

Witness Hoter-Yishai: "Correct......I believe that if I were to try to confine myself to a few sentences, I could say: We found a collection of living people who, psychologically, were not very different from those corpses we found lying there without limbs and even heads. From the physical point of view, everything was done, to a certain extent, especially during the first stages, in order to put them back on their feet, as far as that was possible. If my memory serves me correctly, there were, at the time, in Bergen-Belsen, 52,000 refugees, of whom 27,000 died in the course of receiving medical treatment."

References

Palestine Regiment officers
Jewish Brigade personnel